Tuen Mun District is one of the 18 administrative districts of Hong Kong. It is the westernmost continental district of Hong Kong. It had a population of 487,546 in 2011. Part of the district is the Tuen Mun New Town (or simply Tuen Mun), which contains one of the largest residential areas in the New Territories.

History

Etymology
Other interpretations of the name include , which means opening of the water route. The District was named after the area.

Before the establishment of the District
According to the Old history book of Tang dynasty, and the New history book of Tang dynasty Tuen Mun was a major trading port, and there were garrisons as early as the Tang dynasty (A.D. 618–907). The geo features that described by the historical literature, matching the modern day Tuen Mun. However, some scholar also dispute the interpretation of the location of Tuen Mun. They suggests the historic Tuen Mun may refer to the Nantou in the modern day Shenzhen (historically the residual part of the Xin'an County) instead. Another scholar, Lau Chi-pang, rebutted their interpretation in his article.

The area around Tuen Mun, excluding Tai Lam and Lung Kwu Tan, was placed under Yuen Long yeuk soon after the signing of the Convention for the Extension of Hong Kong Territory in 1898. The Convention leased the New Territories and New Kowloon to the British Empire as an extension of the Colony of Hong Kong. Before the lease, Tuen Man was part of the Xin'an County. In the Xin'an Xianzhi (literally Gazetteer of the Xin'an County) Kangxi edition, Tuen Mun village was under the administration of Wu-dou. Also under Wu-dou, were Kam Tin, Ping Shan, Yuen Long and Shek Kong. They were areas of the modern day Yuen Long District.

Soon after, the District Office North (Northern District, not to be confused with modern-day the Northern District) was established to administer the New Territories including Tuen Mun. After WWII, the Yuen Long District Office was spin-off from the District Office North.

Tuen Mun and its surrounding area were administratively part of Yuen Long District Office until 1974. (some author stated Tuen Mun (branch-)office "established after 1969")

Meanwhile, originally named Castle Peak New Town when planning, the new town of the area was finally named Tuen Mun New Town, adopting the historic name of the region in 1972. The new town was built on reclaimed land from the Castle Peak Bay, as well as levelled hillside areas, starting from the 1960s.

The New Town also incorporated Tuen Mun San Hui, a rural market township, as part of the New Town's town centre.

Establishment to present
In 1974, Tuen Mun District Office, part of the New Territories Administration, was established. In 1982, the Tuen Mun District Council (at first known as Tuen Mun District Board) was established as part of the political reform of the district-level government.

The Tuen Mun District included the (New) Town of the same name, Tuen Mun as well as other areas and villages. In the 2010s, the government announced to build another new satellite town in Hung Shui Kiu, an area that consist of a number of villages and administratively, span between Tuen Mun and Yuen Long Districts.

Tourist attractions

Tuen Mun Town Centre
Tuen Mun Town Centre is the focal point of the district. It features a range of cultural and entertainment facilities and several government buildings, including Tuen Mun Town Plaza, Tuen Mun Cultural Square, Tuen Mun Town Hall, Tuen Mun Public Library, Tuen Mun Park, Tuen Mun Law Courts, Tuen Mun Central Post Office and Tuen Mun Government Offices.

Lung Kwu Tan

Lung Kwu Tan Village has a history of a few hundred years. It is located at the southwest of Castle Peak and consists of Lung Kwu Tan and Lung Kwu Sheung Tan.
It is said that Emperor Bing of Song went down the south as far as to Lung Kwu Tan when he fled from the invading Mongols. There is a cave at Lung Kwu Tan later known as the Emperor's Cave, which is presumably where Emperor Bing took refuge during his stay. Other famous spots include the Tin Hau Temple and the Bogy's Rock.
While Lung Kwu Tan is place of primitive simplicity, the opening of privately run barbecue sites have always drawn crowds of holidaymakers.

Dragon Boat Racing
Every year at Tuen Ng Festival, which is the fifth day of the fifth lunar month, there is dragon boat racing at Castle Peak Bay. The venue is one of the several places where this international cultural and sports event takes place. Every year many people from different companies or organisations join the exciting competition. The event also attracts crowds to watch the exciting race.

Reptile House
Located in Tuen Mun Park, the Reptile House is home to 29 species of reptiles. It opened in 1999 and is operated by the Leisure and Cultural Services Department.

Tsing Chuen Wai

Tsing Chuen Wai is situated in the northern part of Tuen Mun near Lam Tei Tsuen.
Tsing Chuen Wai used to be known as Mak Yuen Wai (i.e. Wheat Field Walled Village). Its present name came from the fact that the village was surrounded by its protective walls made of green bricks. Tsing Chuen Wai is mainly populated by the To Clan. The Tin Hau Temple and the Ancestral Hall in the village are of great historical value. The only surviving portion of the original green-brick boundary wall at the main entrance of the Wai gives visitors an insight into the walled village's precious outlook, which makes an interesting contrast with the newly constructed archway.

Tuen Mun Public Riding School
Opened in 1994, Tuen Mun Public Riding School is located at Lung Mun Road and adjacent to Tuen Mun Ferry Pier.
The School, which occupies an area of 3.58 hectares, is the largest public riding school in Hong Kong. The Hong Kong Jockey Club, which contributed $50 million for the construction of the School, is also the management agent.
The School is well equipped with three paddocks for riding practice, covering a total area of 8,150 square metres. Apart from riding training, the school organises activities for families.

Take LRT route No. 610, 615 or 615P and alight at Butterfly stop, or KMB route No. 59A or 59M, or Citybus route No. 962.

Hong Kong Gold Coast

Hong Kong Gold Coast is the largest tourist resort in Tuen Mun. Its full facilities comprises a world-class resort hotel, a convention centre, a shopping mall, a marina club, the well-known Golden Beach and the newly constructed Hong Kong Gold Coast Dolphin Square.
The Golden Beach is located at 18.5 Miles, Castle Peak Road, adjacent to the Cafeteria New Beach. It is the largest public beach in Tuen Mun and the first artificial beach in Hong Kong. The 545-metre long beach has a total area of 7.85 hectares. Tropical trees, like coconut, and flowers of various species are planted on both sides of a 480-metre long promenade running parallel to it. The design of the snack kiosks and the changing rooms strike a natural harmony with that of the hotel and the shopping mall.
Hong Kong Gold Coast sits close to Castle Peak Bay. The complex in European style replicates the Mediterranean Sentiment. Watching the sunset at an open café on the palm-lined seashore can be an infinite source of artistic inspirations and creativity.
The leisurely and artistic environment makes Hong Kong Gold Coast another Montmartre for Western culture lovers to share their artistic passions by a fine display of art craft. Opened since July 1995, the Gold Coast Montmartre is the first arena of its kind in Hong Kong for street art and culture.
The Art Promenade, located at the seashore outside the Marina Magic Shopping Mall, is an ideal showcase for amateur artists to present their talent in handicrafts such as monochrome drawing, cartoon figure drawing, ornament design, ceramics, rice art, model making, stained sand, colour dyeing, etc.
Performances such as Western verse recital, live bands and classical music are put on at the Cultural Square, which provides an open stage for both professionals and amateurs.

Hung Lau

Hung Lau is located in Chung Shan Park at Lung Mun Road and adjacent to Castle Peak Farm.
Hung Lau faces southeast with Pui To Peak at its back, overlooking the sea off Tuen Mun and facing Lantau Island further across it. The area near the present Butterfly Estate was uninhabited in the late Qing Dynasty and was accessible by water transport only. Legends leave it that Hung Lau became a base for the revolutionaries of the Revive China Society. It was said that secret meetings convened by Dr. Sun Yat-sen and other revolutionaries for planning the Huang Hua-Gang Uprising and the Huizhou Uprising took place at Hung Lau. It was also where they took oath and got their ammunition and food supplies. Thus, Hung Lau has been of great significance to the Nationalist Revolution. A monument to Dr. Sun, a bust of him, a reproduction of his will and a gomuti palm tree planted by the revolutionary martyrs can also be found in Chung Shan Park.

Tuen Mun Golf Centre
The Tuen Mun Golf Centre, located at Lung Mun Road, is the first public golf driving range in Hong Kong. Opened in 1995, the centre occupies an area of 48,500 square metres.
Convenient bookings and inexpensive charges of the centre facilities allow the public to learn to play golf and improve their skills at affordable rates.
The centre is well equipped with a 91-bay driving range, a practice green, a cafeteria and a golf shop. It provides training courses of different levels to cater for both beginners and advanced golf lovers.

Take LRT route No. 610, 615 or 615P and alight at Light Rail Depot stop, or KMB route No. 59A, 59M, 59X or 259D, or Citybus route No. 962 and alight at Sun Tuen Mun Centre.

Places of worship

Ching Leung Nunnery
Situated at Fu Tei, Ching Leung Nunnery was built more than a hundred years ago during the reign of Guang Xu of the Qing Dynasty. Lying in its serenity, the Nunnery was initially known as the Garden of Sweet-scented Osmanthus because this species was seen almost everywhere in the area. It was later renamed Ching Leung Nunnery. The Nunnery is famous for its quality vegetarian food. Coupled also with a tearoom, it is a must-go for gourmet visitors to savour vegetarian meals and Chinese tea.
Besides the pavilions and ponds commonly found in most Buddhist retreats and monasteries, there is also a rubbing of the Sixteen Arhats hanging in the worship hall. It is a rubbing of the stone carving that Emperor Qian Long of the Qing Dynasty found himself enjoying during his visit to the Sheng Yin Temple in Hangzhou.

Take LRT route No. 610, 614, 615 or 715 and alight at Lam Tei stop, or KMB route No. 53, 63X, 68A, 258P, or 960P, or minibus running between Jordan and Yuen Long.

Tsing Shan Monastery

The Tsing Shan Monastery (青山禪院) nestles at the foot of Castle Peak. There are the Pui To Cave, Tsing Wan Koon and Tsing Shan Temple. These historical monuments, characterised by their simplicity and solemnity, have stood through the ages on the wooded hill in the secluded and scenic surroundings. Upon entering the Monastery, visitors will see the Chinese characters "香海名山" (Fragrant Sea and Prestigious Hill) engraved on the archway. It is an inscription by the then Governor Sir Cecil Clementi. On the other side of the archway are the characters "回頭是岸" (Turn Back and There is the Shore, meaning Repentance is Salvation), an inscription by Master Tit Xim. Both the surroundings and the inscriptions naturally inspire nostalgic thoughts of the Monastery's unique past. Originating from Shiwan, the ridge tile of the archway is an exquisite art.
Legend has it that an accomplished Indian Buddhist monk who liked roaming around in a big wooden cup eventually came to Castle Peak. Attracted by the favourable environment for spiritual nurturing, he built a cottage there for practising his religion. Since then, the name of Master Pui To (meaning Traveling in a Cup) has become widely known. In memory of him, his followers made an altar out of a flat rock inside the Cave, and behind the altar a statue of him. However, other legends say the Pui To Cave was built in the Jin Dynasty and redeveloped in the Song Dynasty. Subsequent maintenance from time to time managed to preserve the relic to this day.
Adjacent to the Mahavira Hall is Ching Wan Koon (青雲觀), which is dedicated to Dou Lao, a Goddess who is believed to be able to free people from their worries.
Tsing Shan Temple is the leading one among the three major ancient temples in Hong Kong. There is the Mahavira Hall in the Temple. Up on the stone steps leading to the Hall are inscribed "一切有情、同登覺地" (May All Sentient Beings Attained Nirvana Together), which speaks of the appealing Buddhist path of Ultimate Liberation.

Take LRT route No. 610 or 615 and alight at Tsing Shan Tsuen stop. Then walk along the Tsing Shan Monastery Path for about 30 minutes, or take KMB route No. 57M, 66X, or MTR bus No. 506.

Ching Chung Koon

Ching Chung Koon (青松觀) is another tourist attraction in Tuen Mun. It is a Taoist temple originally opened as a rural retreat in 1949. This peaceful temple also contains many treasures, such as lanterns from Beijing's Imperial Palace. The temple is divided into several houses where many dead peoples' bone ash are permanently stored in special apartments with their picture, name, date of birth, date of death and his or her origin. During Ching Ming Festival and Chung Yeung Festival, many people go there to reminisce and respect their deceased friends or relatives.

To get to Ching Chung Koon, we can take LRT route no. 615P, 615 or 610 from Siu Hong station and then get off the train in Tsing Shan Tsuen stop.

Miu Fat Buddhist Monastery

Based on the principle of practising compassion, Miu Fat Buddhist Monastery (妙法寺), in Lam Tei, has been actively organising activities to promote Buddhism as well as education, culture, charity and welfare for years.
The Miu Fat Buddhist Monastery was first constructed in 1950. Over the following two decades came the construction of the 3-storey Ten Thousand Buddhas Hall at a cost of $60 million. It took six years to complete, with its consecration ceremony held in May 1980. The Mahavira Hall, located on the top storey, has a floor height of about 20 metres. In the middle of the Hall, there are three gold-plated statues of the Buddha Sakyamuni, each of them is about 5 metres tall. Its interior walls are adorned with over 10 thousands of Buddha reliefs and a number of murals featuring a blend of Sino-Thai cultures, which are so magnificent and eye-catching. Higher up in the Hall are the Library of Buddhist Scriptures and the Attic of the Jade Buddha. On each side of the main entrance of the Hall is a 20-metre column carved with a dazzling lifelike giant gold-scaled dragon, making the building prominently imposing. The Monastery also has a kitchen serving mouthwatering vegetarian food for visitors.
Adjoining the existing Ten Thousand Buddha Pagoda, the 45-metre-high and 7-storey main complex of Miu Fat Buddhist Monastery has been built since 1999. It comprises a Buddhist shrine, a community hall, a library and cultural/welfare facilities. The complex is meticulously designed with Lotus Shrine on the top floor resembling a gigantic crystal lotus blossom viewed from afar. A ceremony was held in mid-March in 2010 to mark the completion of this electricity-saving and trendy Shrine. The lookout of the Shrine overlooks the landscape of Tuen Mun rural area.

Hau Kok Tin Hau Temple

Hau Kok Tin Hau Temple (后角天后廟) is located in Tin Hau Road, next to Tuen Mun station on West Rail line.
Being a hub of waterway transport, Tuen Mun attracted fishermen communities in ancient times. The fishermen wished to enjoy the protection and blessings of the Heavenly Empress, Goddess Tin Hau and built a temple at Hau Kok in Kau Hui to worship Tin Hau and pray for safety. During the Ming Dynasty, the To clansmen, who were engaged in the salt business, migrated to Tuen Mun. They developed close ties with local fishermen and worked together for the expansion of the Temple. People living in the walled villages also helped in financing its renovation on a number of occasions. The Temple has always been well patronised by worshippers. During the Tin Hau Festival (i.e. the 23rd day of the third month in the Chinese calendar) every year, villagers and fishermen hold a series of celebrations in the open space in front of the temple. They pray for prosperity and peace by staging thanksgiving opera performances as well as dragon and lion dances. Every year, Lunar New Year fair will be organised in the square in front of Tin Hau Temple. Besides, it is also a place for earthen pot gathering.

Transport 

Tuen Mun District was only connected via the Tuen Mun Road and the Castle Peak Road to the city until the West Rail line was opened in 2003. Citizens also choose the bus to go into the city, and also the Light Rail to connect to Yuen Long District。

Railways
Tuen Ma line - Tuen Mun Station, Siu Hong Station
Light Rail - Route 505, 507, 610, 614, 615

Main roads 

There was only one highway into Tuen Mun from Kowloon and Hong Kong Island before 2020, because the Tuen Mun Road was loaded with traffic pressure from Yuen Long District, citizens often suffered from traffic jams until the Tsing Long Highway was opened since 2003. Also, the Tuen Mun–Chek Lap Kok Link was opened in 2020, so citizens can now go to the Hong Kong International Airport in a shorter time.

bus

Public facilities

Town Hall

The Tuen Mun Town Hall is a cultural complex managed by the Leisure and Cultural Services Department. It is served by the Town Centre stop of the LRT.

Swimming pools
There are three public swimming pools in Tuen Mun District. Two of them are outdoor unheated except Tuen Mun North West Swimming Pool with indoor heated.
 Tuen Mun Swimming Pool, located on Hoi Wong Road. There are main pool, secondary pool, training pool, 2 teaching pools, diving pool, toddlers' pool, spectator stand (700 seats) and family changing room. The facilities for persons with disabilities in the pool include barrier free access facilitating entrance to the pool deck area, changing room and toilet.
 The Jockey Club Yan Oi Tong Swimming Pool, located on Tsing Chung Koon Road. There are two leisure pools.
 Tuen Mun North West Swimming Pool, located on Ming Kum Road near Po Tin Estate. Provide a spectator stand with 800 seats and main pool, secondary pool and training pool for outdoor; toddlers' pool, heated pool and massage pool for indoor.

Beaches
There are six beaches in Tuen Mun District in total. They are all provided with shark prevention nets.

Butterfly Beach
Butterfly Beach is located on Lung Mun Road. The enquires of the beach are 2404 8656 and 2451 3461. There are changing rooms, shower facilities and toilets on this beach. Lifeguard service hours are 0900–1800 in April to May, September to October, and also on Mondays to Fridays in June to August. On Saturdays, Sundays and public holidays in June to August, lifeguard service hours are 0800–1900. Lifeguard services are suspended during winter (November to March).

Castle Peak Beach

The address of Castle Peak Beach is 19 milestone, Castle Peak Road. There are fast food kiosk, BBQ area, changing room, shower facilities, toilet and car park. Lifeguard service hours are 0900–1800 in April to May, September to October, and also on Mondays to Fridays in June to August. On Saturdays, Sundays and public holidays in June to August, lifeguard service hours are 0800–1900. Lifeguard services are suspended during winter (November to March).

Kadoorie Beach

The address of Kadoorie Beach is 18 milestone, Castle Peak Road. There are BBQ area, changing rooms, shower facilities and toilet. Lifeguard service hours are 0900–1800 in April to May, September to October, and also on Mondays to Fridays in June to August. On Saturdays, Sundays and public holidays in June to August, lifeguard service hours are 0800–1900. Lifeguard services are suspended during winter (November to March).

Cafeteria Old Beach
The address of Cafeteria Old Beach is 18 milestone, Castle Peak Road. There are refreshment kiosk, BBQ area, changing room, shower facilities, toilet and bathing shed. Lifeguard service hours are 0900–1800 in April to May, September to October, and also on Mondays to Fridays in June to August. On Saturdays, Sundays and public holidays in June to August, lifeguard service hours are 0800–1900. Lifeguard services are suspended during winter (November to March).

Cafeteria New Beach
The address of Cafeteria New Beach is 18 milestone, Castle Peak Road. There are refreshment kiosk and beach volleyball court. Lifeguard service hours are 0900–1800 in April to May, September to October, and also on Mondays to Fridays in June to August. On Saturdays, Sundays and public holidays in June to August, lifeguard service hours are 0800–1900. Lifeguard services are suspended during winter (November to March).

Golden Beach

The address of Golden Beach is 18 milestone, Castle Peak Road. There are Restaurant, Refreshment Kiosk, changing room, shower facilities and toilet. Lifeguard service hours are 0900–1800 in April to May, September to October, and also on Mondays to Fridays in June to August. On Saturdays, Sundays and public holidays in June to August, lifeguard service hours are 0800–1900. Lifeguard services are not suspended during winter(November to March) and the hours are 0800–1700.

Public libraries
There are three public libraries, Tuen Mun Central Library, Butterfly Estate Public Library and Tai Hing Public Library.

Football

Tuen Mun SA are based in Tuen Mun Tang Shiu Kin Sports Ground and feature in the Hong Kong First Division League.

EcoPark
The 20-hectare (200,000 square metres) EcoPark is located at Tuen Mun Area 38. By providing exclusive land to recycling and environmental industry, EcoPark aims at promoting waste recycling in Hong Kong. Phase I of the EcoPark (about 80,000 square metres) will be made available for occupation by end 2006, while Phase II (about 120,000 square metres) will be commissioned in 2009.

Hospitals
There are three hospitals in Tuen Mun District in total.

Castle Peak Hospital

Castle Peak Hospital (CPH) is a psychiatric hospital with about 1,100 beds. It provides general psychiatric admissions for residents of NTW cluster. Forensic inpatient service is provided to the whole of Hong Kong. It also manage a network of psychiatric clinics and a day hospital, providing outpatient and day patient services. As at 31 March 2009, the hospital had a staff force of 1201, consisting of 61 doctors, 524 nurses, 53 allied health staff and 563 other grades of staff. Its address is 15 Tsing Chung Koon Road, Tuen Mun, NT.

Opened in 1961, Castle Peak Hospital is the psychiatric hospital with the longest history in Hong Kong. Most of the wards of the hospital is "gazetted", meaning that the wards of the Hospital admit voluntary and involuntary patients under the Mental Health Ordinance. All types of modern psychiatric treatment work are available in hospital, including the use of drugs and other physical methods of treatment, and psychological and social treatment. Multi-disciplinary teamwork is emphasised in the provision of treatment and care for patients. The recent trend is to put emphasis not only on hospital treatment, but also on community psychiatric care. The hospital is seeking to provide an integrated service, taking hospital care and community care as complementary to one another. Altogether there are 16 male wards and 11 female wards and 3 mixed sex wards. Patients of open wards can walk about freely within the hospital compound. Many of these patients are undergoing intensive rehabilitation in preparation for discharge and some may go out of the hospital in the day time to work during the final stage of their rehabilitation.

CPH is a recognised training centre for trainees in medical, nursing, occupational therapy and other relevant professional fields. Its training program for psychiatric trainees is recognised by the respective Colleges of Psychiatrists in Hong Kong, United Kingdom, Australia and New Zealand.

Tuen Mun Hospital
Tuen Mun Hospital is an acute hospital with a designed capacity of 1,870 beds serving Tuen Mun New Town and the northwest regions of the New Territories. The planning of the Tuen Mun Hospital Complex was begun in 1979. After more than ten years of planning and commissioning the hospital finally commenced operation and started admitting patients on 8 March 1990. The Day Procedure Unit was opened in November 1990 to provide day care services to patients. The 24-hour accident & emergency service commenced in January 1992.

Siu Lam Hospital
Opened in June 1972, Siu Lam Hospital (SLH) is the only convalescent and rehabilitation hospital exclusively providing comprehensive and integrated rehabilitative and infirmary services to adult severely mentally handicapped (SMH) patients in Hong Kong.

Siu Lam Hospital provides SMH patients with treatment and training. Apart from medical and psychiatric services, they can benefit from nursing care, occupational therapy, physiotherapy, prosthetic & orthotic, medical social as well as social education service. An outreach team has also been formed to serve patients in the territory.

Subsequent to the renovation work and an extension project, the bed complement is now 350, and the number of staff is 324. To give its environment a lively and colourful look and help in their recovery, the hospital has been decorated with murals both inside and outside the wards. A multi-sensory room was constructed at the end of 1995 to provide various sensory stimulations and experiences for patients to enhance their quality of life. To assist patient's rehabilitation, a rehab-bus was procured and a rehab garden was also constructed in 1996.

Seating services with equipment of special chairs and assistive devices for patients commenced in early 1997 by the Occupational Therapy Department and a mini-hydrotherapy pool was put into use in 2003 for the rehabilitation of the SMH patients. It provides a relaxing environment for patients with physical disabilities to mobilise their limbs such that their mobility can be maintained and help in their recovery.

In 2006, a Computer Aided Rehabilitation Training Room was opened for use. The room is equipped with specially designed input switches, programmable keypads and rehabilitation software for the SMH patients. Patients can, by attending training, have their sensory and cognitive skills enhanced.

Power stations
There are two power stations to the west of Tuen Mun, which are run by CLP Power Hong Kong Limited, called Black Point Power Station and Castle Peak Power Station.

Education

There are currently 50 secondary schools, 56 primary schools and 50 kindergartens in Tuen Mun. There are also 5 special schools for mentally or physically disabled children. According to the "Choice of Schools List for Central Allocation (Primary One Admission 2004)", there are 42 primary schools allocated in Tuen Mun, which can be chosen through three school nets, nos. 69, 70 and 71.

Lingnan University

Lingnan University, previously situated at Stubbs Road on Hong Kong Island, moved to its present campus site at Fu Tei in 1995. It is the only tertiary institution in Hong Kong to offer a purely humanities curriculum.

While the architecture of the campus at Fu Tei is modelled on the original in Guangzhou, it has also incorporated novelties with black, white and grey schemes forming its unique colour spectrum. The grandeur and solemnity of the campus building suggest qualities of perseverance and determination.

The university is about a five-minute walk from Siu Hong station (West Rail line). MTR bus route No. K51 also runs to the campus from the station. Alternatively, KMB bus routes No. 53, 67M, 67X, 258P, 261, 267S, 960S or E33P, or minibuses, all run between Jordan and Yuen Long.

Public affairs
Tuen Mun District Council is one of the 18 district councils of Hong Kong. The Council consists of 37 members with 29 of those elected through first-past the post system every four years, 1 ex officio member and the remainings appointed by the chief executive of Hong Kong at the start of a term. The latest election was held in 2019.

See also
 Fernao Pires de Andrade
 List of buildings, sites and areas in Hong Kong

References

External links

 Tuen Mun District Council
 List and map of electoral constituencies (large PDF file)
 Tuen Mun New Town
 Hong Kong Gold Coast
 Hospital Authority